Forman is an unincorporated community on Patterson Creek in Grant County, West Virginia, United States.

The community was named after L. J. Forman, who was instrumental in securing a post office for the town.

References

Unincorporated communities in Grant County, West Virginia
Unincorporated communities in West Virginia